RKL (Lithuanian: Regioninė Krepšinio Lyga, English: Regional Basketball League) is a third Lithuania basketball league. Regional Basketball League started their activity in 2005. RKL consists of 32 basketball teams from 28 Lithuania cities. Regions divided to four groups: Aukštaitija, Žemaitija, Suvalkija and center of Lithuania. Each group has eight basketball teams. In the 2006-2007 RKL season, there was some differences as the regions was divided to two groups: East and West of Lithuania and the number of participants was 28 (14 teams for each group). There is B Division of RKL, which is the 4th tier basketball league of Lithuania.

League champions
 2005–2006 season (debut): BC Mažeikiai
 2006–2007 season: BC Juventus
 2007–2008 season: Šiaulių ABRO-Saulė
 2008–2009 season: BC Radviliškis
 2009–2010 season: BC Ežerūnas-Karys
 2010–2011 season: BC Ežerūnas-Karys
 2011–2012 season: BC Olimpas Plungė
 2012–2013 season: BC Trakai
 2013–2014 season: BC Rasai
 2014–2015 season: BC Telšiai
 2015–2016 season: KTU
 2016–2017 season: BC Tauragė
 2017–2018 season: BC Gargždai-SC
 2018–2019 season: BC Lūšis
 2019–2020 season: KK Perlas Vilkaviškis
 2020–2021 season: BC Kretinga

References

External links
 Official website of Natural Pharmaceuticals-RKL (Lithuanian)

2005 establishments in Lithuania
Basketball leagues in Lithuania
Sports leagues established in 2005
Lithe
Professional sports leagues in Lithuania